The Liberia national under-17 football team is one of the national male football teams of Liberia.It represents Liberia at the under-17 level within international competitions. It has become Liberians favorite (of all the national teams), due to it unique (possession) style of play, being referred to as "tao tao".

Ansumana Keita is the current manager of the Liberia national under-17 football team.

References

under-17
Liberia